"No Tomorrow" is the 12th episode in the third season of the television series How I Met Your Mother and 56th overall. It originally aired on March 17, 2008. It was the first episode to air after the 2007–2008 Writers Guild of America strike concluded.

Plot 
Ted, Marshall and Lily decide to spend Saint Patrick's Day 2008 holding a board game night at Marshall and Lily's new apartment, rather than drinking green beer with a green-suited Barney. Barney, although insulted, accepts his fate and leaves alone. Soon after, Barney calls Ted, having procured a cab and two hot dates for the night. He proposes his theory of "No Tomorrow" and that "today" will have no consequences, and finally convinces Ted to join him by promising him one of his dates. Future Ted reveals that the Mother was present at the party that he and Barney attended that night.

Back at board game night, Marshall and Robin discover that Marshall and Lily's new apartment is crooked. Marshall convinces Robin to keep it a secret from Lily, at least for the time being. However, when a painting on the wall suddenly moves, Lily senses something weird. To cover the truth, Marshall concocts a story about the ghost of a Confederate general haunting the apartment. Eventually, the secret comes out and Marshall, Lily and Robin end up inventing a game called "roller luge" as a means of getting over the crooked floor. Marshall and Lily then move back in with Ted while their apartment is being renovated.

Meanwhile, out with Barney, Ted discovers that, for one night only, the universe seems to work in reverse and rewards him for every bad deed he does. He ditched Marshall and Lily and found himself with a hot date, then he and Barney ditched their dates in line outside a nightclub, and inside they found themselves outnumbered by hotter or equally hot women. He puts two expensive bottles of champagne on someone else's tab, and is presented with free caviar. The biggest reward comes when he gets hit on by a sure thing named Ashlee (Vanessa Minnillo). To test his theory he asks Ashlee if she would have a one-night stand with him and then forget about it entirely the next morning, to which she agrees, thus confirming his theory. Then, Ashlee confides in him that she is married, which fills him with panic and guilt. Barney approves of Ted's actions but disapproves of his reluctance to proceed. Back with Ashlee, Ted hesitates and then gets punched out by the man whose tab he had used.

Ted wakes up at home the next morning with a black eye and fond memories, telling Marshall that after police arrested the man he got to drink for free for the rest of the night. However, Marshall is far from impressed and reminds Ted that he committed credit card fraud and kissed a married woman. To further the point, he reveals that Ted had accidentally pocket dialled his phone the whole time. Seventeen voice messages are played and remind Ted of how he abandoned his date at the door, ordered champagne on a stranger's bar tab and wanted to have sex with a woman with no intention of seeing her again (all while extremely drunk). Ashamed of his behavior, Ted thanks Marshall for confronting him with the hard truth.

Ted returns to the club to retrieve his phone, which he had left behind. He doesn't find it, but he grabs an abandoned yellow umbrella and walks home in the rain. Future Ted reveals that his eventual wife had been at the club that night, but they did not meet and he's glad because he knows that if they had, she would not have liked him.

In the last scene, Barney wakes up next to a dumpster, proclaims, "I'm awesome" and stumbles away.

Critical response 

Donna Bowman of The A.V. Club rated the episode B+.

Michelle Zoromski of IGN gave the episode 8 out of 10.

Several critics speculated on whether actress Nicole Muirbrook, who is credited as "Woman" in the episode, could be the titular Mother.

Joel Keller of TV Squad described the episode as "above average" and wondered if the show would survive to be renewed for a fourth season. The article also included a poll asking if the woman Ted ran into was the mother or a red herring thrown in by the writers.

Omar of Television Without Pity rated the episode with a grade B.

This is the second most watched episode of season 3.

References

External links 
 

2008 American television episodes
How I Met Your Mother (season 3) episodes
Saint Patrick's Day television episodes